Subsonic 3: Skinner's Black Laboratories is a collaborative album by Andy Hawkins and Justin Broadrick, released on August 29, 1995 by Sub Rosa.

Track listing

Personnel 
Adapted from the Subsonic 3: Skinner's Black Laboratories liner notes.
Musicians
 Justin Broadrick – electric guitar (1–4), production (1–4)
 Andy Hawkins – electric guitar (5, 6), production (5, 6)
Production and additional personnel
 Guy Marc Hinant – editing
 Bill Laswell – production (5, 6)
 Layng Martin – engineering (5, 6), mixing (5, 6)
 Manuel Mohino – engineering
 Robert Musso – engineering (5, 6), mixing (5, 6)

Release history

References

External links 
 Subsonic 3: Skinner's Black Laboratories at Discogs (list of releases)

1995 albums
Collaborative albums
Azonic albums
Justin Broadrick albums
Sub Rosa Records albums
Albums produced by Justin Broadrick
Albums produced by Bill Laswell
Albums produced by Andy Hawkins (musician)